Elections to Rotherham Metropolitan Borough Council were held on 3 May 2007. The Labour Party kept overall control of the council. One third of the council was up for election and no boundary changes were made.

After the election, the composition of the council was:
Labour 54
Conservative 7
Others 2

Election result

References

2007 English local elections
2007
2000s in South Yorkshire